Agrarian Democratic Party (ADS) is an agrarian political party in the Czech Republic, founded on 9 December 2015. The party considers itself to be a successor to the Republican Party of Farmers and Peasants, building on the legacy of Antonín Švehla.

Leaders
Pavel Šrámek (since 2019)
Petr Šrámek (since 2018)

References

External links
Agrarian Democratic Party official site

Agrarian parties
Pro-European political parties in the Czech Republic
2015 establishments in the Czech Republic
Political parties established in 2015